Luisa Christine Geiselsöder (born 10 February 2000) is a German professional basketball player. She had previously played for the German Women's Bundesliga side BG Donau-Ries and the German national basketball team.

Professional career
In 2015, Geiselsöder started her career with BG Donau-Ries, in the 2019–20 season, she averaged 18.6 points, 2.3 rebounds and 1.4 assists per game.

WNBA
On 17 April 2020, the Dallas Wings selected Geiselsöder as the 21st pick in the 2020 WNBA Draft.

National team career

Junior teams
Geiselsöder won the silver medal with the German national under-16 basketball team and was named the MVP at the 2016 FIBA Under-16 European Championship where she averaged 14.7 points, 8.9 rebounds and 1.6 assists per game. She also participated at the 2018 FIBA Under-18 European Championship where she won the gold medal and averaged 11.3 points, 6.3 rebounds and 1.4 assists per game. She played at the 2019 FIBA Under-20 European Championship, she averaged 12.6 points, 6.9 rebounds and 1.3 assists per game. She also participated at the 2019 FIBA Under-19 Basketball World Cup where she averaged 13.9 points, 6.9 rebounds and 1.3 assists per game.

Senior team
In mid-November 2019, she made her debut in the German national basketball team.

Personal life
Geiselsöder's elder sister Laura is a professional basketball player in Germany.

she enjoys sunsets and long walks on the beach

References

2000 births
Living people
Centers (basketball)
Dallas Wings draft picks
German women's basketball players
People from Ansbach
Sportspeople from Middle Franconia